Sherekinsky is a rural locality (a settlement) in Maritsky Selsoviet Rural Settlement, Lgovsky District, Kursk Oblast, Russia. Population:

Geography 
The settlement is located 57.5 km from the Russia–Ukraine border, 63.5 km west of Kursk, 9 km north of the district center – the town Lgov, 2 km from the selsoviet center – Maritsa.

 Climate
Sherekinsky has a warm-summer humid continental climate (Dfb in the Köppen climate classification).

Transport 
Sherekinsky is located 12 km from the road of regional importance  (Kursk – Lgov – Rylsk – border with Ukraine) as part of the European route E38, on the road  (Lgov – Konyshyovka), 1 km from the nearest (closed) railway halt 575 km (railway line Navlya – Lgov-Kiyevsky).

The rural locality is situated 70 km from Kursk Vostochny Airport, 151 km from Belgorod International Airport and 273 km from Voronezh Peter the Great Airport.

References

Notes

Sources

Rural localities in Lgovsky District